The 11th AARP Movies for Grownups Awards, presented by AARP the Magazine, honored films released in 2011 and were announced on January 20, 2012. The ceremony was hosted by actor Michael Nouri on February 6, 2012 at the Beverly Wilshire Hotel in Los Angeles. Sharon Stone was the winner of the annual Career Achievement Award, and Martin Scorsese won the award for Breakthrough Achievement for his film, Hugo.

Awards

Winners and nominees

Winners are listed first, highlighted in boldface, and indicated with a double dagger.

Career Achievement Award
 Sharon Stone

Breakthrough Accomplishment
 Martin Scorsese: "Scorsese’s first-time use of 3-D technology transforms the screen into the most spectacular pop-up book you’ve ever seen."

Films with multiple nominations

References

AARP Movies for Grownups Awards
AARP